Penda Bah (born 17 August 1998) is a Gambian footballer who plays as a midfielder and captains the Gambia women's national team.

Club career
Ahead of the 2019 NWPL season, Bah signed for newly promoted Nigeria Women Premier League side, Dream Stars F.C.

References 

1998 births
Living people
Gambian women's footballers
Women's association football midfielders
The Gambia women's international footballers
Gambian expatriate women's footballers
Gambian expatriate sportspeople in Nigeria
Expatriate footballers in Nigeria Women Premier League